This article is about the particular significance of the year 1733 to Wales and its people.

Incumbents

Lord Lieutenant of North Wales (Lord Lieutenant of Anglesey, Caernarvonshire, Denbighshire, Flintshire, Merionethshire, Montgomeryshire) – George Cholmondeley, 2nd Earl of Cholmondeley (until 7 May); George Cholmondeley, 3rd Earl of Cholmondeley (from 14 June) 
Lord Lieutenant of Glamorgan – Charles Powlett, 3rd Duke of Bolton
Lord Lieutenant of Brecknockshire and Lord Lieutenant of Monmouthshire – Thomas Morgan
Lord Lieutenant of Cardiganshire – John Vaughan, 2nd Viscount Lisburne
Lord Lieutenant of Carmarthenshire – vacant until 1755
Lord Lieutenant of Denbighshire – Sir Robert Salusbury Cotton, 3rd Baronet (from 21 June)
Lord Lieutenant of Pembrokeshire – Sir Arthur Owen, 3rd Baronet
Lord Lieutenant of Radnorshire – James Brydges, 1st Duke of Chandos

Bishop of Bangor – Thomas Sherlock
Bishop of Llandaff – John Harris 
Bishop of St Asaph – Thomas Tanner (from 23 January)
Bishop of St Davids – Nicholas Clagett

Events
21 June - The post of Lord Lieutenant of Denbighshire is combined with that of Custos Rotulorum of Denbighshire.
29 November - Charles Talbot is appointed Lord Chancellor.
5 December - Charles Talbot, 1st Baron Talbot of Hensol, is raised to the peerage.
date unknown
Legal proceedings in the Welsh courts to be conducted in the English language.
John Myddelton, politician, inherits the estates of his brother Robert, including Chirk Castle.

Arts and literature

New books
"Gwinfrid Shones" (popular ballad)
William Wynn writes his first poem, while a student at Oxford.

Births
March - John Lloyd, Rector of Caerwys, antiquary (died 1793)

Deaths
22 January - Thomas Herbert, 8th Earl of Pembroke, about 66
2 February - Robert Price, judge, 80
28 February - John Morgan, poet, 45
7 May - George Cholmondeley, 2nd Earl of Cholmondeley, Lord Lieutenant of North Wales, 66/67
June/July - Michael Pritchard, poet, 24
date unknown - Robert Myddelton, owner of the Myddelton estates

References

 Wales